Chandia may refer to 

Chandia, Madhya Pradesh
Chandiya, a village in Kutch, India
Chandiya (film), a 1965 Sri Lankan action movie
Ali Asad Chandia (born 1976), Pakistani-born teacher convicted of terrorism in the United States
Carlos Chandía (born 1964), Chilean football referee
Juan Chandía (1892–1964), Chilean politician
caste in pakistan specially in punjab and sindh